Lusatia (rarely also referred to as Sorbia) is a historical region in Central Europe, split between Germany and Poland. Lusatia stretches from the Bóbr and Kwisa rivers in the east to the Pulsnitz and Black Elster rivers in the west, and is located within the German states of Saxony and Brandenburg as well as in the Polish voivodeships of Lower Silesia and Lubusz. Lusatia's central rivers are the Spree and the Lusatian Neisse, which constitutes the border between Germany and Poland since 1945 (Oder–Neisse line). The Lusatian Mountains (part of the Sudetes), separate Lusatia from Bohemia (Czech Republic) in the south. Lusatia is traditionally divided into Upper Lusatia (the hilly southern part) and Lower Lusatia (the flat northern part).

The areas east and west along the Spree in the German part of Lusatia are home to the Slavic Sorbs, one of Germany's four officially recognized indigenous ethnic minorities (alongside Sinti and Roma, Frisians, and Danes). The Upper Sorbs inhabit Saxon Upper Lusatia, and the Lower Sorbs Brandenburgian Lower Lusatia. Upper and Lower Sorbian are spoken in the German parts of Upper and Lower Lusatia respectively, and the signage there is mostly bilingual. German and Sorbian-speakers were expelled from the regions east of the Lusatian Neisse in and after 1945, when the eastern part of Lusatia became Polish and was repopulated by Polish-speakers.

Lusatia is the theme of the Sorbian national anthem Rjana Łužica (Rědna Łužyca). The Lusatian Lake District (Lausitzer Seenland) is Europe's largest artificial lake district. The village of Herrnhut (Ochranow) is the seat of the Moravian Church. Muskau Park in Bad Muskau (Mužakow) and Łęknica is a UNESCO World Heritage Site. The Tropical Islands Resort, a large water park housed in the biggest free-standing hall in the world, is located in the north of Lusatia. The closest international airport to Lusatia is Dresden Airport in Klotzsche (Kłóčow).

The largest Lusatian city is Cottbus (Chóśebuz), other notable towns are the former members of the Lusatian League (the German/Polish twin towns of Görlitz (Zhorjelc) and Zgorzelec, Bautzen (Budyšin), Zittau (Žitawa), Lubań, Kamenz (Kamjenc), and Löbau (Lubij)), as well as Żary, the German/Polish twin towns of Guben (Gubin) and Gubin, Hoyerswerda (Wojerecy), Senftenberg (Zły Komorow), Eisenhüttenstadt (Pśibrjog), and Spremberg (Grodk).

Etymology
The name derives from the Sorbian word łužicy meaning "swamps" or "water-hole", Germanized as Lausitz. Lusatia is the Latinized form which spread in the English and Romance languages area.

Geography

Lusatia comprises two both scenically and historically different parts: a hilly southern "upper" section and a "lower" region, which belongs to the North European Plain. The border between Upper and Lower Lusatia is roughly marked by the course of the Black Elster river at Senftenberg and its eastern continuation toward the Silesian town of Przewóz on the Lusatian Neisse. Neighbouring regions were Silesia in the east, Bohemia in the south, the Margraviate of Meissen, and the Duchy of Saxe-Wittenberg in the west as well as the Margraviate of Brandenburg (Mittelmark) in the north.

Upper Lusatia

Upper Lusatia (Oberlausitz or Hornja Łužica) is today part of the German state of Saxony, except for a small part east of the Neisse River around Lubań, which now belongs to the Polish Lower Silesian voivodeship. It consists of hilly countryside rising in the South to the Lusatian Highlands near the Czech border, and then even higher to form the Zittau Hills, the small northern part of the Lusatian Mountains (Lužické hory/Lausitzer Gebirge) in the Czech Republic.

Upper Lusatia is characterized by fertile soil and undulating hills as well as by historic towns and cities such as Bautzen, Görlitz, Zittau, Löbau, Kamenz, Lubań, Bischofswerda, Herrnhut, Hoyerswerda, and Bad Muskau. Many villages in the very south of Upper Lusatia contain a typical attraction of the region, the so-called Umgebindehäuser, half-timbered-houses representing a combination of Franconian and Slavic style. Among those villages are Niedercunnersdorf, Obercunnersdorf, Wehrsdorf, Jonsdorf,  Sohland an der Spree with Taubenheim, Oppach, Varnsdorf or Ebersbach.

Lower Lusatia

Most of the area belonging to the German state of Brandenburg today is called Lower Lusatia (Niederlausitz or Dolna Łužyca) and is characterized by forests and meadows. In the course of much of the 19th and the entire 20th century, it was shaped by the lignite industry and extensive open-pit mining. Important towns include Cottbus, Eisenhüttenstadt, Lübben, Lübbenau, Spremberg, Finsterwalde, Senftenberg (Zły Komorow), and Żary, which is now considered the capital of Polish Lusatia.

Between Upper and Lower Lusatia is a region called the Grenzwall, literally meaning "border dyke", although it is in fact a morainic ridge. In the Middle Ages this area had dense forests, so it represented a major obstacle to civilian and military traffic. Some of the region's villages were damaged or destroyed by the open-pit lignite mining industry during the DDR era. Some, now exhausted, former open-pit mines are now being converted into artificial lakes, with the hope of attracting holiday-makers, and the area is now being referred to as the Lusatian Lake District (Lausitzer Seenland).

Lusatian Lake District

The Lusatian Lake District (German: Lausitzer Seenland, Lower Sorbian: Łužyska jazorina, Upper Sorbian: Łužiska jězorina) will become Europe's largest artificial lake district. Some of the biggest lakes are Lake Senftenberg (Senftenberger See / Złokomorowski jazor) and Bluno Southern Lake (Blunoer Südsee / Južny Blunjanski jězor).

Upper Lusatian Heath and Pond Landscape

The Upper Lusatian Heath and Pond Landscape (German: Oberlausitzer Heide- und Teichlandschaft, Upper Sorbian: Hornjołužiska hola a hatowa krajina) is the region richest in ponds in Germany, and together with the Lower Lusatian Pond Landscape forms the biggest pond landscape in Central Europe.

Lusatian capitals 

As Lusatia is not, and never has been, a single administrative unit, Upper and Lower Lusatia have different, but in some respects similar, histories.  The city of Cottbus is the largest in the region, and though it is recognized as the cultural capital of Lower Lusatia, it was a Brandenburg exclave since 1445. Historically, the administrative centres of Lower Lusatia were at Luckau and Lübben, while the historical capital of Upper Lusatia is Bautzen. Since 1945, when a small part of Lusatia east of the Oder–Neisse line was incorporated into Poland, Żary has been touted as the capital of Polish Lusatia.

History

Early history
According to the earliest records, the area was settled by culturally Celtic tribes. Later, around 100 BC, the Germanic Semnones settled in that area. The name of the region may be derived from that of the Ligians. From around 600 onwards, West Slavic tribes known as the Milceni and Lusici settled permanently in the region.

In the 10th century, the region came under the influence of the Kingdom of Germany, starting with the 928 eastern campaigns of King Henry the Fowler. Until 963 the Lusatian tribes were subdued by the Saxon margrave Gero and upon his death two years later, the March of Lusatia was established on the territory of today's Lower Lusatia and remained with the Holy Roman Empire, while the adjacent Northern March again got lost in the Slavic uprising of 983. The later Upper Lusatian region of the Milceni lands up to the Silesian border at the Kwisa river at first was part of the Margraviate of Meissen under Margrave Eckard I.

At the same time the Polan duke of the later Kingdom of Poland raised claims to the Lusatian lands and upon the death of Emperor Otto III in 1002, Margrave Gero II lost Lusatia to the Polish Duke Boleslaw I the Brave, who took the region in his conquests,  acknowledged by Henry II first in the same year in Merseburg and later in the 1018 Peace of Bautzen, Lusatia became part of his territory; however, Germans and Poles continued to struggle over the administration of the region. It was regained in a 1031 campaign by Emperor Conrad II in favour of the Saxon German rulers of the Meissen House of Wettin and the Ascanian margraves of Brandenburg, who purchased the March of (Lower) Lusatia in 1303.

In 1367 the Brandenburg elector Otto V of Wittelsbach finally sold Lower Lusatia to King Karel of Bohemia, thereby becoming a Bohemian crown land.

Bohemian rule 

As Margrave Egbert II of Meissen supported anti-king Rudolf of Rheinfelden during the Investiture Controversy, King Henry IV of Germany in 1076 awarded the Milceni lands of Upper Lusatia as a fief to the Bohemian duke Vratislav II. After Emperor Frederick Barbarossa had elevated Duke Vladislaus II to the rank of a King of Bohemia in 1158, the Upper Lusatian lands around Bautzen evolved into a Bohemian crown land. Around 1200, large numbers of German settlers came to Lusatia in the course of the Ostsiedlung, settling in the forested areas yet not inhabited by the Slavs. The Bohemian rule in Upper Lusatia was secured with the extinction of the rival Brandenburg House of Ascania in 1320 and the rise of the Luxembourg dynasty, Kings of Bohemia starting in 1310.

In 1346 six Upper Lusatian cities formed the Lusatian League to resist the constant attacks conducted by robber barons. The association supported King Sigismund in the Hussite Wars leading to armed attacks and devastation. The cities were represented in the (Upper) Lusatian Landtag assembly, where they met with the fierce opposition of the noble state countries.

Following the Lutheran Reformation, the greater part of Lusatia became Protestant except for the area between Bautzen, Kamenz and Hoyerswerda. The Lusatias remained under Bohemian rule – from 1526 onwards under the rule of the House of Habsburg – until the Thirty Years' War.

Saxon rule 

According to the 1635 Peace of Prague, most of Lusatia became a province of the Electorate of Saxony, except for the region around Cottbus possessed by Brandenburg. After the Saxon elector Augustus the Strong was elected king of Poland in 1697, Lusatia became strategically important as the elector-kings sought to create a land connection between their Saxon homelands and the Polish territories.

Herrnhut, between Löbau and Zittau, founded in 1722 by religious refugees from Moravia on the estate of Count Nicolaus Zinzendorf became the starting point of the organized Protestant missionary movement in 1732 and missionaries went out from the Moravian Church in Herrnhut to all corners of the world to share the Gospel.

The newly established Kingdom of Saxony, however, sided with Napoleon; therefore, at the 1815 Congress of Vienna, Lusatia was divided, with Lower Lusatia and the northeastern part of Upper Lusatia around Hoyerswerda, Rothenburg, Görlitz, and Lauban awarded to Prussia. Only the southwestern part of Upper Lusatia, which included Löbau, Kamenz, Bautzen, and Zittau, remained part of Saxony.

Prussian rule  
The Lusatians in Prussia demanded that their land become a distinct administrative unit, but Lower Lusatia was incorporated into the Province of Brandenburg, while the Upper Lusatian territories were attached to the Province of Silesia instead.

The 19th and early 20th centuries witnessed an era of cultural revival for Slavic Lusatians. The modern languages of Upper and Lower Lusatian (or Sorbian) emerged, national literature flourished, and many national organizations such as Maćica Serbska and Domowina were founded.

This era came to an end during the Nazi regime in Germany, when all Sorbian organizations were abolished and forbidden, newspapers and magazines closed, and any use of the Sorbian languages was prohibited. During World War II, some Sorbian activists were arrested, executed, exiled or sent as political prisoners to concentration camps. From 1942 to 1944 the underground Lusatian National Committee was formed and was active in Nazi-occupied Warsaw.

Since 1945 

After World War II according to the Potsdam Agreement, Lusatia was divided between Allied-occupied Germany (Soviet occupation zone) and the Republic of Poland along the Oder–Neisse line. Poland's communist government expelled all remaining Germans and Sorbs from the area east of the Neisse river during 1945 and 1946. The Lusatian National Committee in Prague claimed the right to self-government and separation from Germany and the creation of a Lusatian Free State or attachment to Czechoslovakia. The majority of the Sorbian intelligentsia was organized in the Domowina, though, and did not wish to split from Germany. Claims asserted by the Lusatian National movement were postulates of joining Lusatia to Poland or Czechoslovakia. Between 1945–1947 they produced about ten memorials to the United States, Soviet Union, Great Britain, France, Poland, and Czechoslovakia; however, this did not bring any results. On 30 April 1946, the Lusatian National Committee also submitted a petition to the Polish Government, signed by Paweł Cyż – the minister and an official Sorbian delegate in Poland. There was also a project to proclaim a Lusatian Free State, whose Prime Minister was intended to be the Polish archaeologist of Lusatian origin, Wojciech Kóčka.

In 1945, the northeastern part of Upper Lusatia west of the Neisse rejoined Saxony and in 1952, when the state was divided into three administrative areas (Bezirke), the Upper Lusatian region became part of the Dresden administrative region. After the East German Revolution of 1989, the state of Saxony was reestablished in 1990. Lower Lusatia remained with Brandenburg, from 1952 until 1990 in the Bezirk of Cottbus.

In 1950, the Sorbs obtained language and cultural autonomy within the then–East German state of Saxony. Lusatian schools and magazines were launched and the Domowina association was revived, although under increasing political control of the ruling Communist Socialist Unity Party of Germany (SED). At the same time, the large German-speaking majority of the Upper Lusatian population kept up a considerable degree of local, 'Upper Lusatian' patriotism of its own. An attempt to establish a Lusatian Land within the Federal Republic of Germany failed after German reunification in 1990. The constitutions of Saxony and Brandenburg guarantee cultural rights, but not autonomy, to the Sorbs.

Demographics

Sorbs

More than 80,000 of the Sorbian Slavic minority continue to live in the region. Historically, their ancestors are West-Slavic-speaking tribes such as the Milceni, who settled in the region between the Elbe and the Saale. Many still speak their language (though numbers are dwindling and especially Lower Sorbian is considered endangered), and road signs are usually bilingual. However, the number of all the inhabitants of this part of eastern Saxony is declining rapidly – by 20% in the last 10 to 15 years. Sorbs make efforts to protect their traditional culture manifested in the traditional folk costumes and the style of village houses. The coal industry in the region (like the Schwarze Pumpe power station needing vast areas of land) destroyed dozens of Lusatian villages in the past and threatens some of them even now. The Sorbian language is taught at many primary and some secondary schools and at two universities (Leipzig and Prague). Project "Witaj" ("welcome!") is a project of eight preschools where Sorbian is currently the main language for a few hundred Lusatian children.

There is a daily newspaper in the Sorbian language (Serbske Nowiny); a Sorbian radio station (Serbski Rozhłós) uses local frequencies of two otherwise German-speaking radio stations for several hours a day. There are very limited programmes on television (once a month) in Sorbian on two regional television stations (RBB and MDR TV).

In 2020, despite the loss of the Sorbian language in most of Lusatia, there are some Sorbian traditions and habits that still live on to this day. In February, many people (mostly people from villages, regardless of German or Sorbian ancestry) will still engage in the Sorbian tradition of Zampern (a festive procession). Some Sorbian dishes like boiled potatoes with linseed oil and curd (German: Quark mit Leineöl) are still prevalent and, today, are eaten in other parts of Germany (like Berlin or western Saxony) too. Spreewälder Gurken (pickled cucumbers potted by using a special mixture of herbs and spices) are often associated with the Sorbs even though the cucumbers themselves were introduced by Dutch migrants, who started to pickle them for higher durability. Soon Sorbs adopted the pickling and might have changed the recipes slightly over time.

The traditional Sorbian costumes are still to be worn in the Spreewald region even though mainly in the tourism industry. Recently, some women started to revive traditional clothes by using them as wedding dresses, even though this practise differs from original traditions.

Demographics in 1900
Percentage of Sorbs:
Cottbus (Chóśebuz), (Province of Brandenburg) 55.8%
Hoyerswerda (Wojerecy), (Province of Silesia) 37.8%
Bautzen (Budyšin), (Kingdom of Saxony) 17.7%
Rothenburg, Oberlausitz (Rózbork),  (Province of Silesia) 17.2%
Kamenz (Kamjenc), (Kingdom of Saxony) 7.1% 
Total number: 93,032

The percentage of Serbs (Sorbs) in Lusatia has decreased since the 1900 census due to intermarriage, germanization, cultural assimilation related to industrialization and urbanization, Nazi suppression and discrimination, ethnocide and the settlement of expelled Germans after World War II, mainly from Lower Silesia and Northern Bohemia.

Literature 
 Micklitza, Kerstin and André: Lausitz – Unterwegs zwischen Spreewald und Zittauer Gebirge. 5. aktualisierte und erweiterte Aufl. Trescher Verlag, Berlin 2016, .
 Brie, André: Lausitz – Landschaft mit neuem Gesicht. Michael Imhof Verlag, Petersberg 2011, .
 Micklitza, Kerstin and André: HB-Bildatlas Spreewald-Lausitz. 4. aktualisierte Aufl. HB Verlag, Ostfildern 2008, .
 Jacob, Ulf: Zwischen Autobahn und Heide. Das Lausitzbild im Dritten Reich. Eine Studie zur Entstehung, Ideologie und Funktion symbolischer Sinnwelten. Hrsg. von der Internationalen Bauausstellung Fürst-Pückler-Land, Großräschen (Zeitmaschine Lausitz), Verlag der Kunst, Dresden in der Verlagsgruppe Husum, Husum 2004, .
 Freiherr von Vietinghoff-Riesch, Arnold: Der Oberlausitzer Wald – seine Geschichte und seine Struktur bis 1945. [Reprint.] Oberlausitzer Verlag, Spitzkunnersdorf 2004, .

See also 

 Herrnhut Moravian Church and Nicolaus Zinzendorf
 Lusatian League
 Milceni
 Wends
 Obotrites

References

External links 

 
Geography of Brandenburg
Regions of Saxony
Historical regions in Germany
Historical regions in Poland
Former duchies of the Kingdom of Bohemia